Mayar مایار is a well-known village and union council in Mardan District of Khyber Pakhtunkhwa. It is located in the NE of Mardan city.

References

Union councils of Mardan District
Populated places in Mardan District